Air Express Algeria  is an Algerian airline dedicated to the Oil and Gas Industry. The company is based in Hassi Messaoud (Algeria).

Air Express Algeria was founded in 2002. The services provided by the company include transportation of personnel, medical evacuation, VIP transport and light cargo. Based in Hassi Messaoud, Algeria Air Express operates to international standards defined by OGP (Oil and Gas Producers).

Fleet 
Air Express Algeria operates eight Raytheon Beech 1900D Airliner, four Let L-410 UVP-E20 and two Pilatus PC-6 Porter aircraft. The total fleet of the company consists of 14 aircraft (2020).

Air Express Algeria was the first operator in Africa to offer the new LET 410 equipped with GE H80 engines.

External links
Air Express Algeria official website

References

Airlines of Algeria
Airlines established in 2002
2002 establishments in Algeria
Companies based in Algiers